The 2019 Leinster Senior Hurling Championship is the 2019 installment of the annual Leinster Senior Hurling Championship organised by Leinster GAA.

Galway were the defending champions, but were eliminated in controversial circumstances in Round 5 and finished fourth in the province, despite having the same number of points as Dublin and Leinster finalists Kilkenny and Wexford. Wexford defeated Kilkenny in the final.

Teams
The Leinster championship was contested by four counties from the Irish province of Leinster, as well as one county from the Irish province of Connacht, where the sport is only capable of supporting one county team at this level.

Personnel and colours

Group table

{| class="wikitable" 
!width=20|
!width=150 style="text-align:left;"|Team
!width=20|
!width=20|
!width=20|
!width=20|
!width=30|
!width=50|
!width=20|
!width=20|
|- style="background:#ccffcc"
|1||align=left| Kilkenny||4||2||1||1||8-85||5-76||18||5
|- style="background:#ccffcc" 
|2||align=left| Wexford ||4||1||3||0||4-84||2-75||15||5
|- style="background:#FFFFE0"
|3||align=left| Dublin||4||2||1||1||7-84||5-79||11||5
|- style="background:#FFFFFF"
|4||align=left| Galway ||4||2||1||1||4-84||6-75||3||5
|- style="background:#ffcccc"
|5||align=left| Carlow (R) ||4||0||0||4||3-64||8-96||–47||0
|}
''Carlow were relegated to the 2020 Joe McDonagh Cup, because the winners of the 2019 Joe McDonagh Cup were from Leinster (Laois).

Group matches

Round 1

Round 2

Round 3

Round 4

Round 5

Final

See also
 2019 All-Ireland Senior Hurling Championship
 2019 Munster Senior Hurling Championship
 2019 Joe McDonagh Cup

References

Leinster
Leinster Senior Hurling Championship